Sandspit is a settlement in the Auckland Region of New Zealand. It is on the Mahurangi Peninsula, about 65 kilometres north of the city centre. It has experienced substantial increases in property values during the first two decades of the 21st century.

Ferries run several times a day from Sandspit to Kawau Island. Ferry service between Sandspit and Kawau first started in 1934, with a boat which was (possibly later) called Nancibel[l]. In the 1950s, Nancibel was replaced by Mairie and Kawau Isle.

Brick Bay, which is adjacent to Sandspit, has a sculpture trail along a two-kilometre path through native bush, fields and ponds.

Demographics
Sandspit settlement is part of the larger Sandspit statistical area.

Sandspit settlement had a population of 525 at the 2018 New Zealand census, an increase of 39 people (8.0%) since the 2013 census, and an increase of 96 people (22.4%) since the 2006 census. There were 228 households, comprising 267 males and 264 females, giving a sex ratio of 1.01 males per female, with 54 people (10.3%) aged under 15 years, 42 (8.0%) aged 15 to 29, 228 (43.4%) aged 30 to 64, and 207 (39.4%) aged 65 or older.

Ethnicities were 96.0% European/Pākehā, 2.3% Māori, 2.3% Pacific peoples, 1.1% Asian, and 2.3% other ethnicities. People may identify with more than one ethnicity.

Although some people chose not to answer the census's question about religious affiliation, 56.0% had no religion, 35.4% were Christian, 1.1% were Hindu and 0.6% were Buddhist.

Of those at least 15 years old, 132 (28.0%) people had a bachelor's or higher degree, and 51 (10.8%) people had no formal qualifications. 111 people (23.6%) earned over $70,000 compared to 17.2% nationally. The employment status of those at least 15 was that 183 (38.9%) people were employed full-time, 90 (19.1%) were part-time, and 6 (1.3%) were unemployed.

Sandspit statistical area

Sandspit had a population of 969 at the 2018 New Zealand census, an increase of 90 people (10.2%) since the 2013 census, and an increase of 168 people (21.0%) since the 2006 census. There were 393 households, comprising 486 males and 483 females, giving a sex ratio of 1.01 males per female. The median age was 54.7 years (compared with 37.4 years nationally), with 123 people (12.7%) aged under 15 years, 114 (11.8%) aged 15 to 29, 426 (44.0%) aged 30 to 64, and 306 (31.6%) aged 65 or older.

Ethnicities were 95.4% European/Pākehā, 3.4% Māori, 2.2% Pacific peoples, 1.2% Asian, and 2.2% other ethnicities. People may identify with more than one ethnicity.

The percentage of people born overseas was 26.9, compared with 27.1% nationally.

Although some people chose not to answer the census's question about religious affiliation, 57.0% had no religion, 33.7% were Christian, 0.6% were Hindu, 0.3% were Buddhist and 0.9% had other religions.

Of those at least 15 years old, 234 (27.7%) people had a bachelor's or higher degree, and 96 (11.3%) people had no formal qualifications. The median income was $37,300, compared with $31,800 nationally. 201 people (23.8%) earned over $70,000 compared to 17.2% nationally. The employment status of those at least 15 was that 363 (42.9%) people were employed full-time, 165 (19.5%) were part-time, and 9 (1.1%) were unemployed.

Notes

Populated places in the Auckland Region
Matakana Coast